Booo Sabki Phategi is a 2019 Hindi horror comedy web series created and produced by Ekta Kapoor for video on demand platform ALTBalaji. The series stars Birbal marks their debut on digital media. The series is available for streaming on the ALT Balaji App and its associated websites from 27 June.

Premise
The story revolves around Manav (played by Tusshar Kapoor) and his friends who gather at an isolated resort. Members of the group start turning up dead and turn into zombies. Manav who looks innocent but has a mysterious side.  Haseena(played by Mallika Sherawat) is a mysterious walking ghost trying to communicate with them.

Cast
Main
 Tusshar Kapoor as Gopal
 Mallika Sherawat as Haseena
 Krushna Abhishek as Vishwas
 Sanjay Mishra as Nainsukh
 Kiku Sharda as Puchki
 Vipul Roy as Veer
 Shefali Zariwala as Khushi
 Sakshi Pradhan as Zara
 Shweta Gulati as Ruchi
 Saba Saudagar as Shalu 
 Anil Charanjeet as Sartaj
Ashwini Kalsekar as Amma
Episodic appearance
 Tasha Bhambra as Doctor Daruwala

Episodes

Production
The series was announced in the first week of February 2019 to be directed by Farhad Samji, starring  
Mallika Sherawat and Tusshar Kapoor, Kiku Sharda, Sanjay Mishra and Krushna Abhishek.

Promotion
The official trailer of the webseries was launched on 17 June 2019 by ALTBalaji. It fetched more than 7.3 million views since its release on YouTube.

References

External links
 

Hindi-language web series
ALTBalaji original programming
Indian comedy web series
Horror fiction web series
2019 web series debuts